Barrett Wilbert Weed (born November 6, 1988) is an American actress and singer. She is best known for originating the roles of Veronica Sawyer in the Off-Broadway production of Heathers: The Musical and Janis Sarkisian in the Broadway production of Mean Girls.

Early life and education
Weed grew up in Cambridge, Massachusetts. At age five, she began performing with the Boston Children's Opera. Her father died from cancer when she was seven years old. Growing up, she attended Long Lake Camp for the Arts in Long Lake, New York.

She attended the Walnut Hill School for most of high school after transferring from a private preparatory school. In an interview, Weed said of the school, "It's an amazing place — like Hogwarts. Walnut Hill saved my life." She credits the staff and standards of Walnut Hill for much of her later success.

She graduated from Elon University with a BFA in musical theatre in 2011.

On April 13, 2019, Weed was awarded a 2019 Top 10 Under 10 Alumni Award from Elon University, an award given annually which "recognizes 10 alumni who have graduated between 2018 and 2009 and who have achieved major professional success, serve as difference-makers in their communities and loyally support Elon."

Weed is the niece of actress Kathi Moss, who originated the role of Saraghina in 1982 Broadway production of Nine and also appeared in original Broadway productions of Grease and Grand Hotel.

Career 
Weed made her Broadway debut in Lysistrata Jones in November 2011, as an understudy for many of the female roles. The show closed on January 8, 2012.

Her next major role was Nadia in a reworked version of Bare: A Pop Opera, now called Bare: The Musical, at New World Stages. Previews began on November 19, 2012, with an official opening on December 9, 2012, and the show ran through February 3, 2013.

She then played Zoe Murphy in Dear Evan Hansen for the May Reading in 2014.

Weed then originated the leading role of Veronica in Heathers: The Musical, a musical adaptation of the 1988 cult film Heathers. The musical premiered at Hudson Backstage Theatre in Los Angeles in the fall of 2013, before moving to New York for its Off-Broadway incarnation. The show began previews at New World Stages on March 15, 2014, with an opening night of March 31. She was nominated for a Lucille Lortel Award and a Drama Desk Award for her performance. Weed left the show in June, and the show closed on August 4, 2014.

In September 2014, Weed began performing in FOUND The Musical, a new Off-Broadway musical about the creation of the Found books and magazines by Davy Rothbart. Weed played the role of Denise. The show opened on October 14 and ran through November 9, 2014.

Weed played the role of Sally Bowles in the Signature Theatre production of Cabaret from May 12 to June 28, 2015, in the Washington, D.C. area. For this performance, she won the Helen Hayes Award for Outstanding Lead Actress in a Musical.

Weed narrates "Kill The Boy Band" by Goldy Moldavsky on Audible.com and Audio CD's, which was audio released on March 1, 2016.

Weed starred in the new musical Mean Girls as Janis Sarkisian on Broadway. She was part of the world premiere which started on October 31, 2017, and ended December 3, 2017, at the National Theatre. The musical, based on the film of the same name began previews on Broadway on March 12, 2018, and officially opened April 8, 2018. Weed has stated she identifies strongly with the 'outspoken cynicism' of her character. Co-star Grey Henson and Weed worked together to receive their roles in the production. Her final performance in the role was March 8, 2020.

When she is not acting, Weed enjoys teaching voice and acting lessons to teenagers, as well as teaching master classes at high schools.

She voiced Stolas Goetia's daughter, Octavia in the adult animated web series Helluva Boss.

On December 2, 2020, it was announced that Weed joined the cast of Bridge and Tunnel, a TV show on Epix. She plays Lizzie, "the artsy, sarcastic older sister of Pags (Brian Muller), who dreams of rock stardom for her all-girl punk band, Wildfire". The show aired on January 24, 2021.

Artistry 
Weed is typically classified as a mezzo-soprano, and is widely known for her high belting.

Personal life 
Weed is an advocate for a number of causes, including female empowerment, gun control, and voting rights.

Filmography

Television

Internet

Theatre credits

Awards and nominations

References

External links

 
 

1988 births
21st-century American actresses
21st-century American singers
21st-century American women singers
Actresses from Boston
American musical theatre actresses
Elon University alumni
Living people
Musicians from Boston
Singers from Massachusetts